Dubrovo is a rural locality (a village) in Korotovskoye Rural Settlement, Cherepovetsky District, Vologda Oblast, Russia. The population was 85 as of 2002.

Geography 
Fedosovo is the nearest rural locality.

References 

Rural localities in Cherepovetsky District